Del Tierro is a Philippine television drama romance series broadcast by GMA Network. Starring Jackie Lou Blanco, it premiered on September 15, 1997 replacing Valiente. The series concluded on May 14, 1999 with a total of 426 episodes and was replaced by Di Ba't Ikaw.

Cast and characters
Lead cast
 Jackie Lou Blanco as Chanda

Supporting cast
 Kaiser Gonzalez as Tristan
 Eddie Gutierrez as Juan del Tierro
 Tonton Gutierrez as Juancho
 Marjorie Barretto as Lourdes
 Glydel Mercado as Guada
 Amy Austria as Dolor
 Mike Magat as Roldan
 Gary Estrada
 Tirso Cruz III as Rigor
 LJ Moreno as Eliza
 Bella Flores as Lucy

References

1997 Philippine television series debuts
1999 Philippine television series endings
Filipino-language television shows
GMA Network drama series
Television series by TAPE Inc.
Television shows set in the Philippines